Northwestern Stage Lines based in Spokane, Washington, U.S., is an intercity common carrier of passengers by bus serving Washington and Idaho. It has been a subsidiary of Salt Lake Express since 2022.

Routes
 Spokane to Seattle/Everett/Tacoma via Interstate 90, U.S. Highway 2 over scenic Stevens Pass, and Interstate 5.
 Spokane to Boise via US-195, US-95 and ID-55.

Apple Line 
A new 160 mile bus route from Omak, through Wenatchee to Ellensburg was added in 2009 as part of the Travel Washington network.

See also 
Trailways Transportation System
Thruway Motorcoach

References

External links 

 Apple Lines

Intercity bus companies of the United States
Transportation companies based in Washington (state)
Trailways Transportation System